Akseki is a town and district of Antalya Province in the Mediterranean region of Turkey. According to 2010 census, population of the district is 15,912 of which 3,441 live in the town of Akseki. 

Known for its snowdrops, Akseki is located in the western Taurus Mountains at an elevation of 1500m. The Manavgat River passes through a large valley in the centre of the district, which is otherwise mainly mountainous. Places of interest include caves, valleys and a number of high meadows. This windswept rocky mountainside is not good farmland and the local economy mostly depends on forestry and raising sheep and cattle. Many people from Akseki have migrated to Antalya but still have homes here as an escape from the summer heat on the coast. The people of Akseki have a reputation as canny traders, and some prominent businessman were brought up here including restaurateur and fruit-juice producer Ömer Duruk. 

Akseki was formerly Byzantine town of Marla, Marulya, or Marulia. It was conquered by the Seljuk Turks and the Ottoman Empire along with other towns in the area.  

Antalya's Akdeniz University has a branch here training nurses, and doing some other vocational training. 

With its rich architectural heritage, Akseki is a member of the Norwich-based European Association of Historic Towns and Regions.

The country boasts an economy based on cattle and almond trade.

Neighbourhoods

Akşahap 
Alaçeşme  
Aşağıaşıklar  
Bademli  
Belenalan 
Bucakalan 
Bucakkışla 
Büyükalan 
Ceceler  
Cemerler  
Cendeve 
Cevizli 
Değirmenlik 
Dikmen 
Dutluca 
Emiraşıklar 
Erenyaka 
Geriş  
Gümüşdamla 
Güneykaya 
Günyaka  
Güzelsu 
Güçlüköy  
Hocaköy 
Hüsamettinköy  
Karakışla  
Kepez 
Kepezbeleni  
Kuyucak 
Mahmutlu 
Menteşbey  
Pınarbaşı 
Sadıklar 
Salihler 
Sarıhacılar 
Sarıhaliller 
Sinanhoca 
Susuzşahap 
Süleymaniye 
Taşlıca 
Yarpuz 
Çaltılıçukur 
Çanakpınar 
Çimiköy 
Çukurköy 
Çınardibi

References

External links
 District governor's official website 

Towns in Turkey
Populated places in Antalya Province
Districts of Antalya Province
Akseki District